Lindiwe Dlamini (born 1965) is a politician from Eswatini who is serving as President of the Senate of Eswatini. She also served as Minister of Public Works and Transport.

References 

Government ministers of Eswatini
1965 births
Living people
Presidents of the Senate of Eswatini
Women legislative speakers